South Carolina Highway 247 (SC 247) is a  state highway in the U.S. state of South Carolina. The highway connects Belton and Ware Place with rural areas of Anderson and Greenville counties.

Route description
SC 247 begins at an intersection with SC 20 (North Main Street) in Belton, within Anderson County, where the roadway continues as Breazeale Street. SC 247 travels to the northeast and crosses over some railroad tracks before leaving the city limits. It crosses over West Prong Broadmouth Creek and Broad Mouth Creek. Farther to the northeast, it crosses the Saluda River on the Cooley Bridge. This crossing marks the Greenville County line. The highway winds its way to the north-northeast, through mostly rural areas of the county before meeting its northern terminus, an intersection with US 25 (Augusta Road) in Ware Place.

Major intersections

See also

References

External links

SC 247 at Virginia Highways' South Carolina Highways Annex

247
Transportation in Anderson County, South Carolina
Transportation in Greenville County, South Carolina